Tracy Poust is a producer and writer known for her work on the American television sitcom Will & Grace (1998–2006, 2017–2020) and the ABC show Ugly Betty (2006–2010).

References

External links 
 
 Guide to Comedy page at the BBC

American television producers
American television writers
Living people
Year of birth missing (living people)
American women television writers
American women television producers
21st-century American women